Luis Otavio Bonilha de Oliveira, known as Nenê Bonilha (17 February 1992), is a Brazilian professional footballer who plays as a central midfielder for Tombense.

Club career
He started in the youth of the Society Sports Sanjoanense in São João da Boa Vista, transferring later to the Paulista de Jundiaí in 2006. He later played for Audax São Paulo on loan from Corinthians.

Career statistics
(Correct )

References

External links

Living people
1992 births
Brazilian footballers
Campeonato Brasileiro Série B players
Paulista Futebol Clube players
Sport Club Corinthians Paulista players
Avaí FC players
Vila Nova Futebol Clube players
Grêmio Osasco Audax Esporte Clube players
Primeira Liga players
C.D. Nacional players
Vitória F.C. players
Fortaleza Esporte Clube players
C.D. Veracruz footballers
Association football midfielders
People from São João da Boa Vista